Donald Struan Robertson, FBA (28 June 1885 – 5 October 1961) was a classical scholar, particularly noted for his work on Apuleius, and for 22 years the Regius Professor of Greek at the University of Cambridge.

Life
Robertson was born in London, the son of Agnes Lucy Turner, a descendant of Robert Chamberlain (d. 1798), ceramicist, and Henry Robert Robertson (1839–1921), an artist. After education at Westminster School, he won a scholarship to Trinity College, Cambridge, and was placed in the first class of both parts of the Classical Tripos, graduating in 1908. Having won several prizes as an undergraduate, he competed for, and in 1909 won, a Trinity fellowship with a dissertation on the manuscript tradition of Apuleius's Apologia which he illustrated with stories from Apuleius's Metamorphoses.

The whole of Robertson's academic life, from undergraduate to retirement, was spent in Cambridge at Trinity College. Interrupted only by war service, where he was commissioned in the Royal Army Service Corps rising to the rank of major, Robertson lectured and supervised at Trinity until in 1928 he succeeded A. C. Pearson as the Regius Professor of Greek, holding the chair until 1950.

Robertson published his first book, A Handbook of Greek and Roman Architecture, in 1929; however, the work for which he is best remembered is his text of the Metamorphoses of Apuleius, published in the Budé series in three volumes between 1940 and 1945.

Robertson was elected a Fellow of the British Academy in 1940; he received honorary degrees from the universities of Durham, Glasgow, and Athens.

He died in Cambridge, aged 76.

Family

Robertson and his first wife, Petica Coursolles, née Jones (1883–1941), were parents to Charles Martin Robertson, an eminent scholar of Greek vase painting, and Giles Henry Robertson, Professor of Fine Art at the University of Edinburgh.

His sister Agnes Arber was a botanist and the first woman life scientist to become a Fellow of the Royal Society, and his sister Janet was painter.

References

1885 births
1961 deaths
People educated at Westminster School, London
Alumni of Trinity College, Cambridge
Fellows of Trinity College, Cambridge
English classical scholars
Members of the University of Cambridge faculty of classics
Fellows of the British Academy
British Army personnel of World War I
Royal Army Service Corps officers
Regius Professors of Greek (Cambridge)